A parallel novel is an in-universe (but often non-canonical) pastiche (or sometimes sequel) piece of literature written within, derived from, or taking place during the framework of another work of fiction by the same or another author with respect to continuity. Parallel novels or "reimagined classics" are works of fiction that "borrow a character and fill in his story, mirror an 'old' plot, or blend the characters of one book with those of another". These stories further the works of already well-known novels by focusing on a minor character and making them the major character. The revised stories may have the same setting and time frame and even the same characters.  

Goodreads maintains a list of its readers' ratings of the most popular parallel novels; as of 2022, these included Wide Sargasso Sea, Wicked, The Penelopiad, and Telemachus and Homer.

Legal issues
Creating parallel novels can have significant legal implications when the copyright of the original author's work has not expired, and a later author makes a parallel novel derived from the original author's work.

Examples
Wild Wood (1981) by Jan Needle parallels The Wind in the Willows from the perspective of the stoats and weasels.
 The Last Ringbearer (1999) by Kirill Eskov parallels The Lord of the Rings with the Mordorians as the heroes.
 The Wind Done Gone (2001) by Alice Randall parallels Gone with the Wind.
 March (2005) by Geraldine Brooks parallels Little Women (1868).
 Longbourn (2013) by Jo Baker parallels Pride and Prejudice.

See also
According to Spike Milligan

Copyright protection for fictional characters
Crossover (fiction) - Sometimes canonical mixing of characters or worlds from originally separate fictional universes.
Intercompany crossover comics.

 
 
 Klinger v. Conan Doyle Estate, Ltd.
 Mashup novel - Non-canonical mixing of texts in new genres without continuity often in parody.
 Nichols v. Universal Pictures Corp.

References

Literary genres
Metafiction	
Literature about literature	
Settings	
 	
Unofficial adaptations
Postmodern literature